Rabelera holostea, known as greater stitchwort, greater starwort, and addersmeat, is a perennial herbaceous flowering plant in the family Caryophyllaceae. It was formerly placed in the genus Stellaria, as Stellaria holostea, but was transferred to the genus Rabelera in 2019 based on phylogenetic analyses. It is the only species in the genus Rabelera. Greater stitchwort is native to Western and Central Europe, including the British Isles.

Greater stichwort can be found in woodlands, edges, and open fields and is sometimes grown in gardens.

Description
The long, narrow (lanceolate) leaves are greyish green, hairless, sessile, opposite, and decussate (the successive pairs borne at right angles to each other).

The sepals are much shorter than the petals.

Taxonomy

Etymology
The specific epithet holostea comes from the Greek holosteon, meaning 'entire bone'; a reference to the brittleness of the weak stems of this plant.

Common names
The common name stitchwort is a reference to a herbal remedy in which this plant is used allegedly to cure side stitch, which afflicts many people when they try to run without stretching first. Other common names for Rabelera holostea include: daddy's-shirt-buttons, poor-man's buttonhole, brassy buttons, wedding cakes, star-of-Bethlehem, and snapdragon. Many of these names are in reference to the stems, which easily break.

References

Caryophyllaceae
Flora of Europe
Plants described in 1753
Taxa named by Carl Linnaeus